Colonel Alberto Larraguibel Morales (May 30, 1919 – April 12, 1995) was a Chilean Army officer born in Angol, Chile. He remains as the record holder for highest jump, one of the longest-running unbroken sport records in history –  years .

On 5 February 2013, Google Doodle celebrated 64th anniversary of Alberto Larraguibel's record-setting Puissance jump.

Biography
He was born on May 30, 1919.

The Committee of Records ratified this record on May 28, 1949, and stated that a height of at least  must be cleared to beat it.

Larraguibel died in Santiago, Chile at the age of 75.

References

1919 births
1995 deaths
Chilean Army officers
Chilean male equestrians
Chilean people of Basque descent
Show jumping riders
People from Angol
Pan American Games gold medalists for Chile
Pan American Games medalists in equestrian
Sports world record holders
Equestrians at the 1951 Pan American Games
Medalists at the 1951 Pan American Games
20th-century Chilean people